Dâures is a constituency in the Erongo Region of Namibia. Its former name was Brandberg constituency, after the tallest mountain in Namibia, the Brandberg. It had a population of 11,350 in 2011, up from 10,289 in 2001.  the constituency had 7,882 registered voters.

Dâures Constituency extends from the national road B2 to the Ugab River and has a radius of approximately 120 km. The largest settlement in the constituency is Uis. It also contains the settlements of Okombahe and Omatjette, as well as the smaller populated places of Omihana, Ovitua, Odama, Okamapuku, Ozondati, and Tubusis.

Politics
Dâures has been a United Democratic Front (UDF) dominated constituency since its establishment in 1992. Only in the 2010 regional elections, SWAPO took the lead for the first time with Ernst Katjiku getting 1,394 votes, 23 more votes than Apius Auchab of the UDF (1,371 votes). Fredrika Gertze of the National Unity Democratic Organisation received 207 votes and Seth Angalie Manga of the Rally for Democracy and Progress received 195 votes.

In the 2015 regional elections the constituency went back to the UDF with Joram Kennedy ǃHaoseb winning 1589 votes against Katjiku's 1390. I was the only constituency won by the UDF in these elections. ǃHaoseb was reelected in the 2020 regional election, winning the constituency with 1,448 votes. SWAPO was again runner-up, its candidate Theresia Inecia Brandt received 1,147 votes. In third place was Abiud Uaja Karongee, an independent candidate. He obtained 481 votes.

Economy and infrastructure
Apart from the B2 on which it borders, Dâures constituency contains only untarred roads. The main economic activity is agriculture.

References

Constituencies of Erongo Region
States and territories established in 1992
1992 establishments in Namibia